The Thai women's league Play-Offs round held on 19,20,30 September 2020 and 1,3,4 October 2020.

Teams  

 Chonburi FA
 Tiger Kids Mukdahan United
 Lopburi City
 Nonkhamdechudom United
 MH Nakhonsi
 Thawi Wattana Samutsakhon United
 SW Samutsakhon
 Lampang Sports School
 Khonkaen City
 BRU Burirat Academy
 Kasembundit
 Prime Bangkok
 Hinkon United
 Bangkok Sports School
 Rajpracha
 B.S.L. WFC (International teams that have been invited to the competition)

Rules 

Compete in matches within championship teams to qualify for 2020/21 Thai Women's League 1, while the 2nd and 3rd ranked teams in each group. Will be eligible to compete at 2020/21 Thai Women's League 2, while the final ranked teams in each group will not be eligible for the 2020/21 season.
The rules for the ranking of the Thai Women's Football League play-offs rounds are: 1. Points, 2. Head-to-Head and 3. Goal difference

Groups

Group A

Round 1

Round 2

Round 3

Group B

Round 1

Round 2

Round 3

Group C

Round 1

Round 2

Round 3

Group D

Round 1

Round 2

Round 3

Qualify teams for 2020/21 Thai Women's League 1
Lampang Sports School
BRU Burirat Academy 
MH Nakhonsi 
Chonburi FA

Qualify teams for 2020/21 Thai Women's League 2

Lopburi City
Prime Bangkok
Hinkon United
Rajpracha
Khonkaen City
Kasembundit
Bangkok Sports School
B.S.L. WFC

References

Thai Women's League